Matthew Curtis may refer to:
 Matthew Curtis (mayor) (1807–1887), British industrialist and mayor of Manchester
 Matthew Curtis (composer) (born 1959), British classical composer